Atomics can refer to:
Atomics (comics), superhero team created by Mike Allred
Atomics (Dune), nuclear weapons in the Dune universe 
Atomic instructions, CPU operations that guarantee all-or-nothing behavior, even when multithreading or interrupts are involved

See also 
 Atomic physics
 Atomix (disambiguation)
 Nuclear physics